Prof. Athanasios K. Tsakalidis (born 1950) is a Greek computer scientist, a professor at the Graphics, Multimedia and GIS Laboratory, Computer Engineering and Informatics Department (CEID), University of Patras, Greece.

His scientific contributions extend diverse fields of computer science, including data structures, computational geometry, graph algorithms, GIS, bioinformatics, medical informatics, expert systems, databases, multimedia, information retrieval and more. Especially significant contributions include co-authoring Chapter 6: "Data Structures" in the Handbook of Theoretical Computer Science with his advisor prof. Kurt Mehlhorn, as well as numerous other elementary theoretical results that are cataloged in the article Some Results for Elementary Operations published in Efficient Algorithms in celebration of prof. K. Mehlhorn's 60th birthday.

Scientific Research

His research interests include: Data Structures, Graph Algorithms, Computational Geometry, GIS, Medical Informatics, Expert Systems, Databases, Multimedia, Information Retrieval, and Bioinformatics.

He has participated in many EU research programs, such as ESPRIT, RACE, AIM, STRIDE, Basic Research Actions in ESPRIT, ESPRIT Special Actions, TELEMATICS Applications, ADAPT, HORIZON, ΕΠΕΤ ΙΙ, ΥΠΕΡ, ΤΕΝ – TELECOM, IST, LEONARDO DA VINCI, MARIE CURIE, SOCRATES.

He is one of the 48 writers (6 of whom have received the ACM Turing Award) of the ground-laying computer science book, Handbook of Theoretical Computer Science, Vol A Elsevier Science publishers, co-published by MIT Press, his work being, along with professor Kurt Mehlhorn, in Chapter 6: Data Structures (his favourite field).

His pioneering results on the list manipulation and localized search problems in the 1980s led to the foundation of the ubiquitous persistence theory on data structures, developed by prof. Robert E. Tarjan.

Other significant results on the design and analysis of data structures were contributed on the problems of interpolation search, negative cycle and nearest common ancestor, the latter being referenced as "Tsakalidis' Algorithm" in the optimal results of prof. Mikkel Thorup.

His extensive work on algorithms, data structures, computational geometry and graph algorithms has been cited and acknowledged by prominent computer scientists like Robert E. Tarjan, Ian J. Munro, Dan Willard, Jon Bentley, Jan van Leeuwen, Timothy M. Chan,  Lars Arge, Mihai Patrascu, Erik Demaine, Mikkel Thorup, Prosenjit Bose, Gerth S. Brodal, Haim Kaplan, Peter Widmayer, Giuseppe F. Italiano, Peyman Afshani, Kasper Larsen and more.

Academic career 
Athanasios Tsakalidis obtained his Ph.D. degree in informatics in 1983 at the Computer Science department of Saarland University, Germany. His thesis is entitled "Some Results for the Dictionary Problem" and was completed under the supervision Professor Kurt Mehlhorn, director of the Max Planck Institute for Informatics. Prior to that he had earned a master's degree (thesis: "Sorting Presorted Files", 1980) and an undergraduate degree in informatics (1977) by the same university. In fact, the latter was his second undergraduate degree, as he had previously graduated from the Mathematics Department of the Aristotle University of Thessaloniki, Greece (1973).

Since 1983, he participated in research for the DFG (Deutsche Forschungsgemeinschaft, the German community of research) and professional teaching at the University of Saarland related to Data Structures, Graph Algorithms, Computational Geometry and programming, until 1989, when he returned to Greece to become an associate professor (and later in 1992 a full professor) at the Computer Engineering and Informatics Department (CEID), University of Patras, where he remains professionally active until today. He was also a visiting professor at King's College London (2003–2006).

Besides significant scientific work, Athanasios Tsakalidis has nominated 26 Ph.D. Fellows, 13 of whom have pursued a successful academic career themselves. Furthermore, he has awarded 63 Master's degrees in computer science and appointed 630 undergraduate majors.

Short Biography 
Athanasios Tsakalidis was born in 1950 in Katerini, Pieria, northern Greece, and studied mathematics at the Aristotle University of Thessaloniki. In 1973 he embarked on a journey around Europe which led him to Saarbrücken, Germany, where he was introduced by prof. Günter Hotz to the novel (at the time) field of computer science that was then being coined informatics. After 28 months of national service, he was enrolled in 1976 to the Computer Science department of Saarland University becoming the oldest undergraduate student (26 years old freshman) to be advised by the youngest professor at the time (27 years old) prof. Kurt Mehlhorn.

Completing a 13 years long academic career in Germany, he returned to Patras, Greece in 1989, when he practically introduced theoretical computer science to the Greek academia and public. Until today he remains an influential academic figure, fundamentally promoting computer science in Greece, either by serving CEID (also as a Chairman in different periods) and also by supporting the establishment and development of computer science departments in many universities across the country.

Arts 
Beyond computer science, Athanasios Tsakalidis has also created hundreds of paintings. A sample is found on his homepage.

References

External links 
Homepage of Athanasios Tsakalidis
List of Publications
Mathematical Genealogy Tree entry

1950 births
Greek computer scientists
Academics of King's College London
Living people
People from Katerini
Aristotle University of Thessaloniki alumni
Saarland University alumni
Academic staff of Saarland University
Academic staff of the University of Patras